Holly Lee Tucker  (born 29 March 1977) is a British entrepreneur, and UK Ambassador for Creative Small Businesses. Tucker is founder of Holly & Co, and founder of notonthehighstreet.

Career 

In October 1995 Tucker began work as a Trainee Account Executive at Publicis, where she had already had a work experience placement for three consecutive summers. Tucker was one of the youngest trainee account executives in London at the time, gaining five years' experience in advertising, working for accounts such as L'Oreal's Luxury Products International division of Prestige and Collections, and Royal Doulton.

In June 2000 she joined a small start-up website, Coolwhite.com, based in Chelsea Harbour. The site offered a wedding directory, allowing the bride or groom to search a curated selection of wedding services directly, such as venues, photographers and florists, all on one platform based on the pay-per-click model.

During her employment with Coolwhite.com, Tucker ran the 'Chiswick Christmas Fair' in October 2003, which was featured in 'The Chiswick'. Due to its success, Tucker handed in her resignation and started her own business, 'Your Local Fair', a series of upmarket events that were staged in affluent areas of London and the South East. In April and June 2004, Tucker ran the Hampstead Children's Fair and Fulham Summer Fair respectively, both of which ran under the banner of 'Your Local Fair'. Tucker ran the final fair, 'Your Chiswick Christmas Fair', at the Town Hall in Chiswick, in December 2004, due to the fact she was heavily pregnant with her son, Harry.

‘Your Local Fair' provided the inspiration for notonthehighstreet.com, which Tucker co-founded with Sophie Cornish in 2006. When the company launched, it was running on a shoestring budget with Tucker and Cornish underwriting the business's debts, working unpaid for over a year with only skeleton staff as support. notonthehighstreet.com has grown to become an award-winning online marketplace, providing a retail platform for 5,000 curated small creative and entrepreneurial businesses, collectively offering more than 200,000 original and innovative products. The company currently employs 200 people at its offices in Richmond-upon-Thames, which Tucker refers to as 'Silicon-upon-Thames'.

In recognition of her contribution to business, Tucker was awarded an MBE for services to small businesses and enterprise as part of the Queen's Birthday Honours List in June 2013.

Tucker was invited to become a "UK Ambassador to Creative Small Businesses" in September 2015, with the official announcement being made by the Prime Minister in November 2015. In this role Tucker represents and supports creative small business in the UK.

In October 2015, she launched Instadvice – a business advice blog offering instant advice to small creative businesses and independents. The advice given is supported by artwork and photography, which is fed through from Tucker's Instagram feed. The success of Instadvice led to the creation of Holly & Co, a curated advice and inspiration platform, which launched in Spring 2017.

Holly & Co launched in Feb 2017 - it has a physical premise The Work/Shop in St Margarets, as well as an online side to the business.  The Holly & Co brand is designed as an immersive experience, created to champion small creative businesses and bring colour to the world of grey business advice.  In September 2018, Holly & Co hosted its first-ever event The Congregation of Inspiration at Syon Park - now described as ‘the most creative event for small business in Europe.’  In September 2018, Holly Tucker launched her podcast series ‘Conversations of Inspiration’ - a series of interviews with UK founders designed to illuminate the journey of building a business through storytelling.  Guests have included, Julie Deane OBE, Kanya King CBE, Richard Reed CBE and Bobbi Brown.

Charity 

Tucker was instrumental in founding The Happy Bricks Foundation, a small non-profit charity which focuses on the lives of disadvantaged children globally, raising money to improve the quality of the environment they live in. The charity, which was founded in April 2013 and officially registered by the Charity Commission in February 2015, has already completed a school build in Lukwambe, Tanzania, and has co-funded the build and fit-out of a new science laboratory at a small independent school in Windsor, The Green Room, which provides an alternative for young people who can no longer access mainstream education.

The school build in Lukwambe was completed and officially opened in April 2015, and now provides an education to 100 children. The charity continues to support the needs of school in terms of development and resources.

The new science laboratory at The Green Room independent school was officially opened in December 2015, enabling the pupils of the school to work toward obtaining a third GCSE in Science, previously only being able to achieve GCSEs in English and Mathematics.

Books 
 Build a Business from your Kitchen Table, 
 Shape up your Business, 
 Do What You Love, Love What you Do,

Awards and honours 

Appointed UK Ambassador for Creative Small Businesses – In November 2015, Tucker was announced as the newly appointed UK Ambassador for Creative Small Businesses. Business Ambassadors are a network of Prime Minister appointed CEOs (or equivalents) and academic leaders, who have a sector focus, reflecting their particular expertise in specific sectors.
 The Google Award for Women in Digital at the Digital Masters Awards – The Digital Masters Awards were created and launched in 2014 to recognise executives working in the UK's digital economy, judged to have shown excellence in digital leadership.
 Ernst & Young Entrepreneur of the Year – The Ernst & Young Entrepreneur of the Year Award honours those who build market-leading companies.
 MBE for 'Services to Small Businesses and Enterprise''' – The Most Excellent Order of the British Empire (often shortened informally to "Order of the British Empire") is the most junior and most populous order of chivalry in the British and other Commonwealth honours systems.
 Investor Allstars: Entrepreneur of the Year, 2012 – This award is for professional excellence and is open to corporate development teams and the M&A teams of corporates who acquire high-growth companies.
 Media Momentum Top 50, 2011 – Celebrate the fastest growing and most promising companies in the digital arena, at the Media Momentum Awards. The Media Momentum league table lists the 50 fastest growing digital companies in Europe.
 The Telegraph Tech Start-Up 100, 2011 – a ranking of promising technology start-ups in Europe.
 Women of the Future Awards, 2009 – The Women of the Future Awards are given to successful young women in Britain. 
 Management Award: 35 Women under 35, 2009 – Management Today's 35 Women Under 35 awards celebrate high-achieving women in business under the age of 35. Women who make the list range from entrepreneurs and designers to lawyers, bankers and senior civil servants.
 BT Business 'Essence of the Entrepreneur' Awards, 2008 – The BT Business Essence of the Entrepreneur competition is awarded to small businesses judged to be making the most effective use of their technology.
 Young Guns 2008'' – These awards aim to highlight founders, co-founders and CEO's under 35 of privately owned businesses, who are demonstrating a unique or outstanding proposition, proven in its market and that has experienced considerable success.

References 

1977 births
Living people
British businesspeople
Members of the Order of the British Empire